This is a list of notable Nepali musical bands or groups.

References

External links 

 
Nepal
bands